Lights Out is an American horror radio program, which ran on various networks from January 1934 to the summer of 1947. Due to a number of recordings being lost, along with syndication having re-edited intros and the titles of broadcasts changing frequently, it may be impossible to ever compile a full list.

Please note that this does not include episodes for the television adaption, and only includes the radio show.

1936

1937

1938

1939

1941

1942

1943

1945

1946

1947

References

External links
 Selection of episodes on Archive.org
 Selection of "Lights Out" scripts at Generic Radio Workshop
 Selection of "Lights Out" scripts at Simply Scripts

Lists of radio series episodes